This is a list of the judgments given by the Supreme Court of the United Kingdom in the year 2011. They are ordered by Neutral citation.

The table lists judgments made by the court and the opinions of the judges in each case. Judges are treated as having concurred in another's judgment when they either formally attach themselves to the judgment of another or speak only to acknowledge their concurrence with one or more judges. Any judgment which reaches a conclusion which differs from the majority on one or more major points of the appeal has been treated as dissent.

Because every judge in the court is entitled to hand down a judgment, it is not uncommon for 'factions' to be formed who reach the same conclusion in different ways, or for all members of the court to reach the same conclusion in different ways. The table does not reflect this.

Table key

2011 judgments

Notes

Judges
 Lord Saville announced his retirement in 2010. His appearance in Baker v Quantum Clothing Group was his last appearance as a Supreme Court Justice.
 Lord Rodger died on 26 June 2011.
 Lord Collins retired in May 2011 but continued as an acting justice until the end of July.
 Lord Wilson became a justice on 26 May 2011.
 Lord Neuberger is the Master of the Rolls and was  not a full member of the Supreme Court, although is entitled to sit at the court's invitation.
 The other members of the court are listed in order of seniority. Lord Phillips and Lord Hope were, respectively, the President and Deputy President of the Supreme Court.

References

External links
 Supreme Court decided cases, 2011

Supreme Court of the United Kingdom cases
Judgments of the Supreme Court of the United Kingdom
Supreme Court of the United Kingdom
United Kingdom law-related lists